The 1977 World Rowing Championships was the 6th World Rowing Championships. The championships were held from 19 to 28 August 1977 on the Bosbaan rowing lake in Amsterdam, Netherlands.

Medal summary

About 556 rowers from 28 countries competed at the event. Medallists at the 1977 World Rowing Championships were:

Men's events

Women's events

In the coxed four, the Bulgarian team was one of the favourites. After two false starts in the final they were disqualified.

Event codes

Finals

Great Britain

References

World Rowing Championships
World
Rowing
World Rowing Championships, 1977
World Rowing Championships
Rowing
World Rowing Championships
1970s in Amsterdam